Robert William Harrell Jr. (born March 7, 1956) is an American politician and member of the Republican Party who served as a member of the South Carolina House of Representatives, representing the 114th District, from 1992 to 2014, serving as the Speaker of the House from 2005 to 2014.

Early political career
Harrell was the chairman of his Freshman Caucus in 1993. Two years after Harrell was elected, he was appointed to serve on the Ways and Means Committee in 1994. Later, he was elected to serve as Majority Leader from 1997–1999 when he became the Ways and Means Committee Chairman in 1999. He has also served as Chairman of the Economic Development and the Public Education Subcommittee of the Ways and Means Committee. In South Carolina, State Legislators serve as part-time employees making only $10,400/year.

Business career
Harrell earned his Bachelor of Science in Business Administration from the University of South Carolina. He opened an insurance agency representing State Farm Insurance in 1980. In 2010, after his father died, Harrell combined his agency with that of his father in Harrell Square, a shopping center owned by the family.  He and his wife Cathy opened an independent insurance agency, Harrell Insurance Agency in 2014.  They now represent over 100 companies such as Progressive, Liberty Mutual, Travelers, Nationwide, Allstate and many more. He previously owned Palmetto State Pharmaceuticals, a pharmaceutical repackaging company that he sold in 2012.

The Harrells have owned several pieces of investment real estate in Charleston, Isle of Palms, Myrtle Beach and Columbia, SC.

Political career

Promotion of economic development
Harrell is credited with negotiating the deal on behalf of the House that brought Boeing to Charleston to build the 787 Dreamliner. He was also instrumental in bringing Southwest and JetBlue as carriers to the Charleston Airport.

In 2008, Harrell, legislative leaders and business executives formed the Knowledge Sector Council. In an effort to support South Carolina’s growing knowledge-based economy, the public/private Council was created to encourage research universities, economic development entities, private businesses and state agencies to work together in expanding jobs and economic opportunity.

In 2010, Harrell sponsored the S.C. Economic Development Competitiveness Act.

Election as Speaker of the House
Harrell ran unopposed as Speaker in 2006 and 2008, and 2012.  In 2010, Harrell had a token opponent for Speaker when Ralph Norman challenged Harrell for the Speaker’s office. Harrell was re-elected, defeating Norman who only drew five votes of support – including his own vote – among the 124 House members. As Speaker of the House, Harrell effectively controlled policy in South Carolina alongside Hugh Leatherman and Glenn F. McConnell during Governor Mark Sanford's administration.

Political contributions
In 2010, Harrell received the largest amount of political contributions – $47,425, or nearly 22 percent – from lawyers and lobbyists, according to OpenSecrets. The next-largest amount, $30,100, came from health professionals. In 2008, Harrell received $361,053 in contributions. The largest contributing industries were real estate ($29,825), and lawyers and lobbyists ($28,000).

Campaign contributions and receipts 
In September 2012, The Post and Courier reported that Harrell had reimbursed himself more than $325,000 from his campaign war chest since 2008 but had produced no receipts or itemized invoices accounting for the spending. Harrell informed The Post and Courier that all his expenses were legitimate and the reimbursements were less than the fair market value.

Harrell provided receipts to an Associated Press reporter who reported that the receipts and invoices were in order.

After two years of investigation, Harrell agreed to pay part of the money to the state’s general fund and pay a fine. Harrell left the House of Representatives shortly thereafter.

Even though he had left office, and was not seeking office, it was too late to remove his name from the ballot in the 2014 elections. Democratic nominee Mary Tinkler received the most votes for the seat, but Harrell still carried Dorchester County even with signs in the polling places stating that he had withdrawn from the election.

References

External links
 South Carolina Legislature – Speaker Robert W. Harrell Jr. – official SC Legislature website
 Project Vote Smart – Representative Robert 'Bobby' W. Harrell Jr. (SC) profile
 Robert W. Harrell Jr. campaign contributions – Follow the Money
 

Republican Party members of the South Carolina House of Representatives
1956 births
Living people
People from Orangeburg, South Carolina
University of South Carolina alumni
Speakers of the South Carolina House of Representatives
South Carolina politicians convicted of crimes